2016–17 Saudi First Division was the 40th season of the Saudi First Division since its establishment in 1976. The season started on 11 August 2016 and concluded on 5 May 2017.

Teams

A total of 16 teams are contesting the league, including 11 sides from the 2015–16 season, two relegated from the 2015–16 Saudi Professional League and three promoted from the 2015–16 Saudi Second Division. Al-Qaisumah were promoted as champions, while Al-Adalh were promoted as Group B winners. Wej secured the final berth by winning the play-offs.

Team changes
The following teams have changed division since the 2015–16 season.

To the First Division 
Promoted from Second Division
 Al-Qaisumah
 Al-Adalh
 Wej

Relegated from Professional League
 Najran
 Hajer

From the First Division 
Relegated to Second Division
 Al-Mujazzal
 Al-Riyadh
 Al-Diriyah

Promoted to Professional League
 Al-Ettifaq
 Al-Batin

Stadia and locations

Results

League table

Results table

Season progress

Statistics

Scoring

Top scorers

Hat-tricks 

Note
(H) – Home; (A) – Away4 Player scored 4 goals

Clean sheets

References

Saudi First Division League seasons
Saudi
2